McCarren is a surname. Notable people with the surname include:

Andrea McCarren, American television journalist
Bill McCarren (1895–1983), American baseball player
Larry McCarren (born 1951), American football center
Louise McCarren Herring (1909–1987), American credit union pioneer
Patrick H. McCarren (1849–1909), New York politician

See also
McCarren Park, public park in the Greenpoint neighborhood of Brooklyn, New York City, USA 
McCarren-Walters Act, the U.S. Immigration and Nationality Act of 1952
McCarran International Airport serving Las Vegas, Nevada